Calloni is an Italian surname. Notable people with the surname include:

Antônio Calloni (born 1961), Brazilian actor
Egidio Calloni (born 1952), Italian footballer
Raffaella Calloni (born 1983), Italian volleyball player
Stella Calloni (born 1935), Argentine writer

Italian-language surnames